Vallda is a locality situated in Kungsbacka Municipality, Halland County, Sweden, with 1,604 inhabitants in 2010. It is referenced by the Swedish group jj in their song are you still in vallda?

Sports
The following sports clubs are located in Vallda:

 Lerkils IF

References 

Populated places in Kungsbacka Municipality